The Sas dla Crusc is a mountain of the Fanes group in South Tyrol, Italy.

References 
 Alpenverein South Tyrol

External links 

Mountains of the Alps
Mountains of South Tyrol